Fu Cheong Estate is a public housing estate in Sham Shui Po, Kowloon, Hong Kong, built on the reclaimed land of the southwest of Sham Shui Po near MTR Nam Cheong station. Built in 2001, the estate was constructed on the former site of the Sham Shui Po bus terminus. Its name, "Fu Cheong", comes from nearby Nam Cheong Estate and means "Wealthy and Prosperity" in Chinese language. It consists of 10 residential buildings and a shopping centre completed in 2001 and 2002.

Houses

Demographics
According to the 2016 by-census, Fu Cheong Estate had a population of 14,900. The median age was 48.2 and the majority of residents (97.7 per cent) were of Chinese ethnicity. The average household size was 2.5 people. The median monthly household income of all households (i.e. including both economically active and inactive households) was HK$20,780.

Politics
Fu Cheong Estate is located in Fu Cheong constituency of the Sham Shui Po District Council. It was formerly represented by Wong Kit-long, who was elected in the 2019 elections until July 2021.

Covid pandemic
Fu Yuet House of the Estate was placed under lockdown for mandatory testing on January 19, 2022.

See also

Public housing estates in Sham Shui Po

References

Residential buildings completed in 2001
Residential buildings completed in 2002
Public housing estates in Hong Kong
Sham Shui Po
2001 establishments in Hong Kong